The New Zealand women's cricket team played the Ireland women's cricket team in June 2018. The tour consisted of one Women's Twenty20 International (WT20I) and three Women's One Day Internationals (WODIs) matches. New Zealand won the one-off WT20I match by ten wickets.

In the first WODI match of the series, New Zealand set a new record for the highest innings total, scoring 490/4 in their 50 overs. At the time it was the highest score in either a men's or women's ODI match. This broke the previous record, also held by New Zealand, of 455/5 against Pakistan in 1997.

In the third WODI match, Amelia Kerr of New Zealand made the highest individual score in a WODI match, and became the youngest cricketer, male or female, to score a double century in One Day International cricket, when she scored 232 not out. New Zealand went on to win the WODI series 3–0, scoring 400 or more runs in three consecutive matches, becoming the first team in men's or women's ODIs to do so. Kerr finished the WODI series as the leading run-scorer and wicket-taker, and was named the player of the series.

Squads

WT20I series

Only WT20I

WODI series

1st WODI

2nd WODI

3rd WODI

Notes

References

External links
 Series home at ESPN Cricinfo

New Zealand 2018
Ireland 2018
2018 in women's cricket
2018 in Irish cricket
2018 in New Zealand cricket
International cricket competitions in 2018
cricket
cricket